George Coffey (1857–1916) was a scholar of Irish history and cultural revivalist.

Coffey was a bookbinder, archaeologist, and the first keeper of antiquities at the National Museum of Ireland. He was associated with the cultural revival movement and Douglas Hyde's Gaelic League and the rediscovery of the Irish language.

Works
His works include :

, ( reprinted by The Dolphin Press 1977  )

References

External links
 
 

1857 births
1916 deaths
Numismatists
Irish antiquarians
Irish archaeologists
Irish non-fiction writers
Irish male non-fiction writers